Native Place is an album by the English band the Railway Children, released in 1990. The band broke up after the album's release, in part due to EMI's acquisition of Virgin Records.

The album peaked at No. 59 on the UK Albums Chart. "Every Beat of the Heart" peaked at No. 1 on Billboard'''s Modern Rock Tracks chart. The band promoted the album by touring with the Heart Throbs.

Production
The album was produced by Steve Lovell and Steve Power. It was recorded over a period of four months, to the annoyance of chief songwriter Gary Newby.

Critical receptionTrouser Press wrote: "No longer an unassuming pop group, the Railway Children are growing into dance-oriented chart hacks." The Washington Post opined that "Native Place is not brave or powerful or important, but it's seriously listenable."

The Daily Breeze determined that the album "leans more toward guitar-oriented pop, boasting strong melodies, airy textures and a sunny optimism." The Dayton Daily News stated that "the group's sound recalls the jangling guitars of the Byrds combined with a sweeping keyboard sound from the early '80s."

AllMusic wrote that "the slick production and sunny synths couldn't leech the buoyancy and emotional impact from the poetic, romantic songwriting and warm harmonies of Gary Newby." MusicHound Rock: The Essential Album Guide deemed Native Place'' "one of the definitive pop albums of the early '90s ... Newby's gentle vocals are flawless."

Track listing

Personnel
The Railway Children
Gary Newby - vocals, lead guitar, keyboards, artwork, sleeve design
Brian Bateman - rhythm guitar
Stephen Hull - bass
Guy Keegan - drums, percussion
with:
Matt Irving - additional keyboards, accordion
Matthew Taylor - saxophone on "Because"

References

1990 albums
The Railway Children (band) albums
Virgin Records albums